Kurskoye is a rural locality (a selo) in Starooskolsky District, Belgorod Oblast, Russia. The population was 651 as of 2010. There are 25 streets.

Geography 
Kurskoye is located 15 km northeast of Stary Oskol (the district's administrative centre) by road. Lapygino is the nearest rural locality.

References 

Rural localities in Starooskolsky District